Thomas Gerald Bowman (born November 1, 1946) is an American political aide and retired Marine Corps Colonel who served as the United States Deputy Secretary of Veterans Affairs from August 10, 2017, to June 15, 2018, when he retired from active federal service.

Bowman received his Bachelor of Arts in Political Science from the University of Texas at Austin and his Juris Doctor from Western New England University. His nomination was confirmed by the United States Senate on August 3, 2017.

References

External links

1946 births
Living people
Place of birth missing (living people)
Trump administration personnel
United States Deputy Secretaries of Veterans Affairs
United States Marine Corps colonels
University of Texas at Austin College of Liberal Arts alumni
Western New England University alumni